Juan Santos Pedevilla (born June 6, 1909, date of death unknown) was an Argentinian football defender who played for Argentina in the 1934 FIFA World Cup. He also played for Club Atlético Estudiantil Porteño.

Fifa World Cup Career

References

External links
FIFA profile

Argentine footballers
Argentina international footballers
Association football defenders
1934 FIFA World Cup players
1909 births
Year of death missing